Edith May Mayne (29 September 1905 – 7 May 1953), later known by her married name Edith Peacock, was an English freestyle swimmer from Newton Abbot, Devon, who broke the world record in the women's 1500-metre freestyle on 15 September  1926 in Exmouth, Devon, clocking 24:00.2. She represented Great Britain in the 400-metre freestyle event at the 1928 Summer Olympics in Amsterdam, Netherlands, but was eliminated in the semi-finals.

See also
 World record progression 1500 metres freestyle

References

External links
 British Olympic Association athlete profile
 Edith Mayne's profile at Sports Reference.com

1905 births
1953 deaths
English female swimmers
English female freestyle swimmers
Swimmers at the 1928 Summer Olympics
Olympic swimmers of Great Britain
World record setters in swimming
People from Newton Abbot